Ballinure GAA  is a Gaelic Athletic Association club in Cork, Ireland. Its playing field is located on the Ringmahon Road and it draws its players from the Mahon and Ballinure areas on the south east side of the city. Teams are fielded in Gaelic football and hurling. The club participates in Cork GAA competitions and in Seandún board competitions.

History
The club was founded in 1959. Notable players include Gary "Spike" O'Sullivan, a professional boxer who held the WBO International Middleweight belt.

Wayne Sherlock also played with Ballinure at a young age but then transferred to the famous Blackrock where he won Cork Senior Championships in 1999, 2001 and 2002 and a Minor Championship in 1994. He also won All-Ireland titles with Cork in 1999, 2004 and 2005.

Achievements
 Cork Junior B Football Championship:  Winner (1) 1986
 Seandún Junior C Football Championship: Winner (4) 2011, 2012, 2015, 2016
 Seandún Junior Football Championship: Winner (1) 1985, Runner Up 1988
 Sèandun Junior Football League: Winners (6) 1985, 2009, 2011, 2014, 2015, 2016
 McCurtain Cup: Winner (1) 1962
 Sèandun Junior Hurling League: Winner (1) 1981
 Sèandun Junior B Hurling League: Winner (1) 2008, 2010
 Seandún Junior B Hurling Championship: Winner (2) 1981, 1985
 Craobh Rua Cup: Winner (2) 1981, 1985
 McSweeney Cup: Winner (1) 1986
 Cork Junior B Football Championship: Winner (1) 1986

References
 http://blackrockcorkonlineheritage.ie/index.php/en/sport/k2-blog-style/item/462-ballinure

Gaelic games clubs in County Cork
Hurling clubs in County Cork
Gaelic football clubs in County Cork